The Early Learning Centre (ELC) is a British retailer that sells toys aimed at younger children. It is part of The Entertainer (through its parent company TEAL Group Holdings). It was a subsidiary of Mothercare until 2019.

History
The original shop opened in 1974 in London Street, Reading, Berkshire. The business was started by David John Beale. The mail order department was in the basement. John employed the services of a child psychologist to ensure that the toys and books were of a positive and educational value to children.

The clever and unique concept was for parents to join as a member, new sets of educational toys/books were then sent to them regularly. If they decided to keep the items, they would pay via their account. If they returned the items, they would not be charged.

It proved very successful and within a year, much larger premises in Silver Street Reading were obtained. John's partner was an accountant named David so Beal used his middle name to avoid confusion.

Originally set up as a mail order company in 1974 and based near Swindon, by 1980, it had ten shops, and has since grown to 215 shops in the United Kingdom, and over 80 in 19 other countries including Qatar, the United Arab Emirates, Canada and Australia. In addition, their toys are available in some stores of Boots and Sainsbury's.

Since 2001, the company sells via their website. In the 1980s, ELC opened a number of "nursery stores", which sold equipment such as pushchairs and cots. Until 1991, the chain had stores in the United States; contrary to standard American English, the British spelling "centre" (spelled "center" in American English) was preserved in these. Over 80% of products sold are own brand, being designed at a research centre in Hong Kong.

Takeovers
In May 1985, John Menzies rescued ELC. Sales struggled in the end of the 1990s.

After some years, the company's board of directors led by Mike France, bought the company back in October 2001 for £30 million, being backed by 3i, before selling it to Tim Waterstone (who founded Waterstones bookstores) under the name Eagle Retail Investments, for £62 million in April 2004, and he joined it with his Daisy & Tom chain of shops within the "Chelsea Stores Group".

In June 2007, ELC was purchased by Mothercare for £85 million, from Chelsea Stores Holdings. Mothercare has continued to expand the high street presence of ELC by opening additional stores; mainly as concessions within over one hundred stores of Mothercare.

On 12 March 2019, it was announced that ELC would be purchased by The Entertainer for £13.5M, formally through TEAL Group Holdings.

References

External links 
 Official website

Retail companies of the United Kingdom
Companies based in Wiltshire
British companies established in 1972
Retail companies established in 1972
Early childhood education in the United Kingdom
Early childhood educational organizations
Educational toy retailers
Toy companies of the United Kingdom
3i Group companies
1972 establishments in England